Cipangocharax placeonovitas is a species of small tropical land snails with an operculum, terrestrial gastropod mollusks in the family Cyclophoridae.

This species is endemic to the limestone region of Kōchi Prefecture, Japan.

References

Molluscs of Japan
Cipangocharax
Gastropods described in 1981
Taxonomy articles created by Polbot
Taxobox binomials not recognized by IUCN